The 15th Pan American Games were held in Rio de Janeiro, Brazil from 13 to 29 July 2007.

Results by event

Swimming
Mario Montoya: Men's 400m Free—16th (4:07.47)

Triathlon

Men's Competition
Leonardo Chacón
 1:53:13.75 – 5th place
Roberto Machado
 did not finish – no ranking

Women's Competition
Alia Cardinale
 2:03:59.86 – 14th place
Monica Umana
 2:12:08.31 – 24th place

See also
 Costa Rica at the 2008 Summer Olympics

External links
Rio 2007 Official website

Nations at the 2007 Pan American Games
P
Costa Rica at the Pan American Games